Ryan Grice-Mullen (born September 12, 1986) is a former gridiron football wide receiver. He was signed by the Houston Texans as an undrafted free agent in 2008. He played college football at Hawaii.

Grice-Mullen has also been a member of the Chicago Bears, BC Lions, Miami Dolphins, Saskatchewan Roughriders, Hartford Colonials and Edmonton Eskimos.

Early years
Grice-Mullen attended Rialto High School in Rialto, California and was a student and lettered three times in football and once in track. In football, he played quarterback, running back, and defensive back, and as a senior, he was an All-League selection and an All-County selection. Grice-Mullen graduated from Rialto High School in 2004.

College career
As a freshman for Hawaii, Grice-Mullen appeared in 12 games, starting 11 of them.  He led UH's receiving corps with 1,228 yards and 12 touchdowns.  He also recorded five 100+ yard receiving games. During his sophomore year, Grice-Mullen was injured for several games and started a total of nine games. During his junior year, Grice-Mullen caught 106 passes for 1372 yards and 13 touchdowns.  He earned first team All-WAC honors and was part of the WAC's Special Award for Offensive Unit of the Year.

Grice-Mullen places prominently on Hawaii's career receiving lists:
 5th in career receptions (237)
 4th career receiving yards (3,370)
 2nd in career receiving touchdowns (36)

Professional career

Pre-draft
On January 8, 2008, he announced that he would skip his senior year of college to enter the 2008 NFL Draft, although unfortunately for him he was not actually drafted.

Houston Texans
Grice-Mullen was signed as an undrafted free agent by the Houston Texans shortly after the 2008 NFL Draft. However, he was released on June 13.

Chicago Bears
On July 24, 2008, Grice-Mullen was signed by the Chicago Bears. He was waived a month later on August 24.

BC Lions
Grice-Mullen was signed to the practice squad of the BC Lions on September 9, 2008, and was later placed on the active roster.  During the 2008 season, Grice-Mullen caught 9 passes for 175 yards and 1 touchdown.  Grice-Mullen caught a 67-yard touchdown pass in the Lions' season finale.

Grice-Mullen finished the 2009 season with 20 catches for 210 yards and one touchdown.  In late November, Grice-Mullen set the CFL record for longest playoff punt return when he returned a punt for 106 yards in the second half for a touchdown.  He was later named special teams player of the week.

Miami Dolphins
Grice-Mullen signed a contract with the Miami Dolphins on January 6, 2010. The move united with fellow former Hawaii receiver and teammate Davone Bess. He was waived on August 18.

Saskatchewan Roughriders
On September 15, 2010, Grice-Mullen returned to the CFL and signed with the Saskatchewan Roughriders.

Edmonton Eskimos
On August 16, 2011, Grice-Mullen signed with the Edmonton Eskimos after slotback Fred Stamps went down with an abdominal injury

References

External links
Just Sports Stats
BC Lions bio
Chicago Bears bio
Hawaii Warriors bio
Miami Dolphins bio

1986 births
Living people
American football return specialists
American football wide receivers
American players of Canadian football
BC Lions players
Canadian football wide receivers
Chicago Bears players
Edmonton Elks players
Hartford Colonials players
Hawaii Rainbow Warriors football players
Houston Texans players
Miami Dolphins players
Players of American football from California
Sportspeople from Rialto, California